Andheri West constituency is one of the 26 Vidhan Sabha constituencies located in the Mumbai Suburban district.

Andheri West is part of the Mumbai North West Lok Sabha constituency along with five other Vidhan Sabha segments, namely Goregaon, Versova, Jogeshwari East, Andheri East and Dindoshi in Mumbai Suburban district.

Members of Legislative Assembly

Election results

Assembly Elections 2019

Assembly Elections 2014

Assembly elections 2009

References

Assembly constituencies of Mumbai
Assembly constituencies of Maharashtra
Politics of Mumbai Suburban district
Andheri